Piotr Masłowski (born 20 February 1988) is a Polish handball player for Atomix-haacht.

Sporting achievements

State awards
 2015  Silver Cross of Merit

References

1988 births
Living people
Polish male handball players
Sportspeople from Płock